The 2012 European Modern Pentathlon Championships were held in Sofia, Bulgaria from July 4 to 10, 2012.

Medal summary

Men's events

Women's events

Mixed events

Medal table

References

External links
 Results

European Modern Pentathlon Championships
European Modern Pentathlon Championships
European Modern Pentathlon Championships
International sports competitions hosted by Bulgaria
Sports competitions in Sofia
July 2012 sports events in Europe